Caherdavin is a northern suburban district of Limerick city in the mid-west of Ireland. It had a population in 2002 of 6,613.

Local landmarks include the Moylish campus of the Limerick Institute of Technology, a third level college and research centre, the Jetland Shopping Centre which opened in 2005, Caherdavin Church, built in 1985, with adjoining primary boys' and girls' schools (Scoil Chríost Rí and Mary Queen of Ireland respectively) and there is also St Nessan's Community College in the nearby Woodview estate. Both the Gaelic Grounds and Thomond Park are nearby.

History
Caherdavin was originally part of the "Northern Liberties" granted to Limerick Corporation in 1216 by King John. It remained part of Limerick City until 1840 when it became part of the new Limerick County Council; it returned to Limerick City in 2008. It was part of the parish of St. Munchin, which originally extended to Cratloe in County Clare, until Christ the King parish was formed after the 1960s housing boom in the area. The site of Caherdavin was developed for housing in the 1960s and has grown rapidly since then. Industry is confined to the Clondrinagh Industrial Estate which houses mainly traditional style workshop units. The other form of employment in the area is the services industry e.g. hotel, shops, doctors surgery. In 2005 the large Jetland Shopping Centre opened, providing new retail space and an 18-hour Dunnes Stores supermarket, which has recently become 8am-10pm. Ivan's shop is at Caherdavin Cross. The Bank of Ireland recently moved its branch from beside Melvin Grove to the Jetland Shopping Centre. The Caherdavin Credit Union is at Redgate. There is a 23-hour Tesco located in the Coonagh Cross shopping centre at the Coonagh roundabout.

Organisation
The district includes the townlands of Ballygrennan, Clonmacken, Caherdavin, Clonconane, Clondrinagh, Coonagh, Knock and Shannabummy. As of 11 November 2016, this area is part of Limerick city. To the south and west is the River Shannon whilst to the east is the old Limerick city boundary Borough and to the north is the boundary with County Clare. An important feature of the area is that it is broken up into four sub-districts by the Clonmacken road, the Ennis road and the Cratloe road. There is Caherdavin Lawn, Caherdavin Park, and Caherdavin Heights. Caherdavin is approximately 1.5 miles north from Limerick city centre.

Clubs
The 23rd Limerick Scout Group has its hall beside the primary schools and has been active for over 30 years. The Community Centre houses a branch of the LCC library. The Irish Girl Guides are active. The Na Piarsaigh GAA clubhouse and grounds is at Caherdavin Lawn. Along with Crowley School of Ballet and tap The Caherdavin & District Credit Union is at Redgate. The local church hosts three choirs - The Senior Choir (which performs at 10:30 during Sunday Mass), the Folk Choir (Which performs at 12 Noon during Sunday mass, and many other functions) and the Taize Choir (Performs at 18:30 during Saturday Mass). The Caherdavin Youth Club, which is one of Limerick's longest running, operates from the Community Centre. A group of former youth club members went on to form the Caherdavin massive crew (CMC) which is made up of clean living men and women in their twenties who strive to make Caherdavin a better place for young and old alike. There is a playing field in Caherdavin Park, near the Greenhills hotel, which is used by the youth soccer teams of Caherdavin Celtic FC and for other community sports.

Transport
Roads run over the three Shannon bridges from the city centre through Caherdavin in the direction of Shannon Airport, Ennis, and Galway. Many of the district's residents are employed on the industrial estates at Raheen and Castletroy, adding to traffic problems at rush hour. Several bus routes are provided by Bus Éireann, Ireland's national bus operator, but as there are very few bus lanes the buses must compete with private traffic. Bus Éireann officials have complained that the round trip on the LIT-UL route (about 14 km) can take up to 2 hours. Bus lanes were introduced on the Ennis Road during the summer of 2007, though the effects of these remain to be seen. A new tunnel project west of the city is hoped to relieve the situation. The Coonagh Aerodrome, a few kilometres west of Caherdavin, provides access for small aircraft. Larger commercial aircraft use Shannon Airport, which lies 20 km west in County Clare.

References

External links
Caherdavin Community Centre
Christ the King, Caherdavin Church
Limerick Institute of Technology
Limerick County Council Caherdavin Planning Review (pdf) and update (pdf)
History of Coonagh airfield

Limerick (city)